Mosaics within Mosaics is the third album released by Circulatory System. It is their second double album and was released on June 24, 2014.

Track listing

References 

2014 albums
The Elephant 6 Recording Company albums
Circulatory System (band) albums